= 2007 FIFA World Cup =

2007 FIFA World Cup may refer to:

- 2007 FIFA Women's World Cup
- 2007 FIFA U-20 World Cup
